Andrew Harrison Leeds (born September 24, 1981) is an American actor, comedian and writer. He is known for his portrayal of Josh on Cristela, Christopher Pelant on Bones, and David Clarke on Zoey's Extraordinary Playlist. He is also in the Main Company of the sketch comedy/improv theater The Groundlings.

Early life
Leeds was born on September 24, 1981 in Tarpon Springs, Florida. While at Stanford University, Leeds participated in theatrical productions on campus. He graduated with a degree in computer science.

Career
Leeds' first job as a professional actor was at  the age of eight as an understudy in the Broadway musical Teddy & Alice. Eventually, Leeds took over the role of Quentin Roosevelt. Leeds then originated the role of Gavroche in the national tour of Les Miserables. After leaving Les Miserables, Leeds appeared in the Broadway production of Falsettos playing the role of Jason on Wednesday and Saturday matinees. He starred in the musical for a year, acting opposite such Broadway legends as Michael Rupert, Chip Zien, and Mandy Patinkin. After taking over the evening performances for a short stint, Leeds departed the production to play the title role in Carly Simon's opera Romulus Hunt.

Leeds appeared in the movie A Pig's Tale produced by Polygram Filmed Entertainment and as Cadet Dotson in Major Payne starring Damon Wayans.

Leeds and his writing partner at the time, David Lampson, were selected to be on the Bravo reality show Situation: Comedy. Produced by Sean Hayes, the show documented the process of making two competing pilots. Leeds and Lampson's pilot, Stephen's Life, was selected out of 10,000 submissions. The pilot was shot for NBC and went on to win the competition, launching Leeds' career as a writer. Leeds then returned to his acting career and appeared on Veep and It's Always Sunny in Philadelphia.

His drama pilot Rex is Not Your Lawyer was produced by NBC in 2011. Leeds and Lampson then wrote another television pilot, a comedy for NBC called Brenda Forever, but it was not ordered for a full series. Leeds was later cast in a regular role as Josh in the ABC comedy Cristela.

Leeds then wrote a comedy pilot called Those People for Kelly Ripa's company and ABC and appeared on the Comedy Central show Workaholics. In November 2015, Leeds became a member of the Main Company of the sketch comedy/improv troupe The Groundlings.

Filmography

Film

Television

References

External links
 

21st-century American male actors
American male film actors
American male television actors
Stanford University alumni
Place of birth missing (living people)
Year of birth missing (living people)
Living people
Male actors from Florida
Male actors from Los Angeles
Actors from Pinellas County, Florida